The gens Ancharia was a plebeian family at ancient Rome.  The first of the gens to achieve prominence was Quintus Ancharius, a senator early in the first century BC.

Origin
The origin of the Ancharii is uncertain, but the nomen Ancharius may be derived from Ancharia, a name of the goddess Angerona, by which she was known at Faesulae.  The ancestor of the Ancharii may have been particularly devoted to the worship of Angerona.  As Faesulae was an Etruscan city, the family may have been of Etruscan origin.

Praenomina
The praenomina associated with the Ancharii are Quintus and Publius.

Branches and cognomina
The cognomina used by the Ancharii included Priscus, a common surname meaning "elder" or "old-fashioned", and Soter, a "savior" or "protector."  The latter surname was borne by a freedwoman, and was not necessarily used by other members of the gens.

Members
 Quintus Ancharius, a senator of praetorian rank, killed by Marius in 87 B.C.
 Ancharia, the first wife of Gaius Octavius, father of Augustus.
 Quintus Ancharius, tribune of the plebs in 59 and praetor in 56 B.C., received the province of Macedonia the following year.
 Ancharius Priscus, prosecuted Caesius Cordus, proconsul of Crete, for treason and extortion in A.D. 21.
 Publia Ancharia Soteris, a freedwoman in Bithynia. Pliny the Younger asked the emperor Trajan to grant her the Ius Quiritium, thereby making her a Roman citizen.

See also
 List of Roman gentes

References

Roman gentes